Schleef is a surname. Notable people with the surname include:

 Einar Schleef (1944–2001), German dramatist, director, set designer, writer, painter, photographer, and actor
 Hans Schleef (1920–1944), Luftwaffe pilot and recipient of the Knight's Cross of the Iron Cross during World War II
 Marco Schleef (born 1999), German footballer
 Wilhelm Schleef, Wehrmacht machine gunner and recipient of the Knight's Cross of the Iron Cross during World War II

See also
 Schlee, surname

German-language surnames